Ebadi is a common family name in Iran and Afghanistan. Ebadi may refer to:

 Ahmad Ebadi, musician and setar-player
 Hassan Ebadi (born 1986), strongman competitor.
 Shirin Ebadi, lawyer and human rights activist

Similar Surnames
Ibadi (Arabic)
Abadi (Hebrew)
Ebata (Japanese)
Bai (Chinese)
Abad (Hispanic) 
Badia (Spanish/Italian) ]]